Dracophyllum scoparium is a species of shrub or small tree endemic to the Chatham Islands of New Zealand. It was first described by Joseph Dalton Hooker in 1844 and gets the specific epithet scoparium, in the form of a broom, for the way in which its juvenile leaves grow. In the heath family Ericaceae, it inhabits the Chatham and Pitt Islands, and reaches a height of 1–4 m.

References

Notes

Citations 

scoparium
Endemic flora of New Zealand